A clamp is a fastening device used to hold or secure objects tightly together to prevent movement or separation through the application of inward pressure. In the United Kingdom the term cramp is often used instead when the tool is for temporary use for positioning components during construction and woodworking; thus a G cramp or a sash clamp but a wheel clamp or a surgical clamp.

There are many types of clamps available for many different purposes. Some are temporary, as used to position components while fixing them together, others are intended to be permanent. In the field of animal husbandry, using a clamp to attach an animal to a stationary object is known as "rounded clamping." A physical clamp of this type is also used to refer to an obscure investment banking term, "fund clamps." Anything that performs the action of clamping may be called a clamp, so this gives rise to a wide variety of terms across many fields.

Types

Temporary

These clamps (or cramps) are used to position components temporarily for various tasks:
 Band clamp or web clamp
 Bar clamp, F-clamp or sliding clamp (upper left in the top photo)
 Cardellini clamp – jaw-style clamp that clamps onto round, square, or rectangular tubing; or onto flat objects, such as dimensional lumber or plywood sheets—to mount motion picture lights, or grip equipment such as gobo heads
 C-clamp (also G-clamp or G-cramp) (lower centre in the top photo)
 Flooring clamp A carpenter's clamp used to cramp up floorboards prior to fixing.
 Forked clamp stainless steel for ST ground glass joints with/without setscrew. Sizes for: ST 14, 19, 24, 29 and 45. 
 Gripe (a specialized clamp, tightened with a wedge, for holding strakes in position when building a clinker boat)
 Hand clamp
 Handscrew (upper right in the top photo)
 Holdfast, a bench clamp for holding things to a bench top or side The bench forms the fixed jaw.
 Magnetic clamp (see Magnetic base)
 Mitre clamp
 Pipe clamp (top of the top photo)
 Sash clamp (a specialized, long form of bar clamp)
 Set screw
 Spring clamp (first item of third row in photo)
 Speed clamp
 Step clamp, a type of serrated-edged clamp used in conjunction with step blocks when machining or milling parts in metalworking
 Toggle clamp
 Toolmakers' clamp (a smaller, precision version of the handscrew, all in steel)
 Pinch Dog (a small "staple" shaped device, designed to straddle a joint, and pull the joint tightly together during the glue up process)
 Clip hangers are a subset of clothes hangers

Permanent
 Hose clamp
 Marman clamp
 Wire rope clamp
 Joiner's dog

Medical
There are various kinds of surgical clamps:
 Foerster clamp
 Hemostatic clamp
 Pennington clamp
 Gomco clamp
 Mogen clamp
 Bone clamp
 Serrefine

Other
 Castration clamp
 Wheel clamp
 Pandrol clip
 Tube clamp (name for the different clamps used in a tube and clamp scaffold)
 Nipple clamp

Gallery

See also
Fixture
Vise

References

Further reading
Patrick Spielman (1986). Gluing and Clamping: A Woodworker’s Handbook. Sterling Publishing. 
Lee Jesberger (2007). Pro Woodworking Tips

Woodworking hand tools
Metalworking hand tools
 
Articles containing video clips